The 2017 Omaha mayoral election was held on May 9, 2017. Incumbent Mayor Jean Stothert won re-election to a second term in office.

The position of mayor in Omaha is officially a non-partisan position. A blanket primary was held on April 4, 2017. The top two finishers in the primary, Jean Stothert and Heath Mello, moved on to the general election.

Alongside the mayor, the Omaha City Council was up for re-election. It is also officially non-partisan. However, it remained controlled by a Democratic majority, as only district 7 has a general election between a Democrat and a Republican. Districts 1, 2, 3, 4 remained Democratic whereas districts 5 and 6 remained Republican. The incumbent Republican in district 7 was re-elected as well.

Primary election

Candidates
 Christopher N. Geary (Voter registration: Independent)
 Heath Mello, former State Senator (Voter registration: Democratic)
 Ean Mikale (Voter registration: Democratic)
 Taylor Royal (Voter registration: Republican)
 Jean Stothert, incumbent Mayor (Voter registration: Republican)

General election

Candidates 
 Heath Mello, former State Legislator
 Jean Stothert, incumbent Mayor

Results by city council district

References

Omaha
Mayoral elections in Omaha, Nebraska
2017 Nebraska elections